Albemarle is a masculine given name which may refer to:

 Albemarle Bertie (MP) (c. 1668–1742), MP for Lincolnshire 1705–1708, Cockermouth 1708–1710 and Boston 1734–1741
 Albemarle Bertie, 9th Earl of Lindsey (1744–1818), Army officer and MP for Stamford 1801–1909
 Sir Albemarle Bertie, 1st Baronet (1755–1824), British admiral
 Albemarle Cady (1807–1888), United States Army colonel and brevet brigadier general
 Albemarle Cator (1877–1932), British Army major-general
 Albemarle Swepstone (1859–1907), English footballer

English-language masculine given names